Mesvres is a commune in the Saône-et-Loire department in the region of Bourgogne-Franche-Comté in eastern France.

History
The bishops of Autun receive Charles the Bald the seat of a priory located in Mesvres. The priory was surrendered in 994 to the Abbey of Cluny. Pierre de Beaufort, prior of Mesvres in 1357, was the last French Pope (Gregory XI) in Avignon.

See also
Communes of the Saône-et-Loire department

References

External links
 La Gazette de Mesvres (Unofficial website) 

Communes of Saône-et-Loire